The 1957 Summer Deaflympics officially known as 8th Summer Deaflympics is an international multi-sport event that was held from 25 to 30 August 1957. This event was hosted by Milan, Italy.

Sports 
 Athletics
 Gymnastics
 Basketball
 Tennis
 Table tennis
 Swimming
 Football
 Shooting
 Water polo

References 

1957
August 1957 sports events in Europe
International sports competitions hosted by Italy
1957 in Italian sport
1957,Summer Deaflympics
Multi-sport events in Italy
1957 in multi-sport events
Parasports in Italy
Sports competitions in Milan
1957,Summer Deaflympics